Soo Kui Jien (born 31 August 1972), is a Malaysian television personality.

Biography 
Better known as Handsome Jien, Jien got his big break when he became a host on the Disney Channel in 1997. He has worked as an emcee and host on television in Hong Kong, Manila, Singapore and Malaysia. He has also acted in a few TV series shown on Singapore and Malaysian TV channels. Jien is based between Kuala Lumpur and ESPN’s studio in Singapore. He was the host of the television show Malaysian Idol, and also the first Asian Idol held in Indonesia.  He is 5' 9" tall.

He also regularly appears on sports programmes for ESPN or ESPN Star Sports. These programmes include Nokia Football Crazy and Top Corner.

Soo married Channel [V] VJ Sarah Tan on 21 December 2007. In April 2008, his wife gave birth to a son named Dylan Robert Soo. In 2014 they welcomed a pair of twins, a boy and a girl.

References 

1972 births
Malaysian people of Chinese descent
Malaysian television personalities
Living people